1UP! is the fourth studio album by ska band illScarlett, released on September 29, 2009 in North America. The first single on the album is titled "Take It for Granted" and was first released on the band's website on August 6, 2009.

Track listing

Personnel

A&R
Greg Boggs

Art/photography
Swavek Piorkowski — art direction, photography
John Wellman — design, layout
Margaret Malandruccolo — photography

Instruments
Alex Norman — guitar
Swavek Piorkowski — drums
Will Marr — guitar
John Doherty — bass
Anthony Carone — keyboard

Mixing/engineering
Robert Carranza

Producing/mastering/management
Robert Carranza — producer
illScarlett — co-producers
Chris Gehringer — mastering
Andy Winkler — management

Vocalists
Alex Norman — lead
Swavek Piorkowski — background
John Doherty — background
Anthony Carrone — background

References

IllScarlett albums
2009 albums
Sony BMG albums